Ena Marie Eristland Nystrøm (born 28 April 2000) is a Norwegian ice hockey goaltender and member of the Norwegian national ice hockey team, currently playing with the Mercyhurst Lakers women's ice hockey program in the College Hockey America (CHA) conference of the NCAA Division I.

Playing career 

Beginning in 2013, Nystrøm played with teams of the Stavanger Oilers ice hockey club in her home town of Stavanger, Norway. In 2018, she left Norway to move to Canada, where she spent a year playing at the Ontario Hockey Academy in Cornwall, Ontario. 

In 2019, she began her college ice hockey career with the RPI Engineers women's ice hockey program in the ECAC Hockey conference of the NCAA Division I. She would finish the season with a respectable .915 save percentage but the team struggled in front of her and she amassed a 0-21-1 record. She was named ECAC Goaltender of the Week in October 2019.

Nystrøm transferred to Mercyhurst University and joined the Mercyhurst Lakers women‘s ice hockey program prior to the 2020–21 season. She earned the first win of her collegiate career against the Robert Morris Colonials on 2 February and recorded a season-high 43 saves in a 5–2 victory over the Syracuse Orange on 5 February.

International play 

Nystrøm took part in the opening ceremony of the 2016 Winter Youth Olympics in Lillehammer. In 2017, she was the starting goalie for Norway as they failed to qualify for the Olympics.

Nystrøm was selected as Best Goaltender by the directorate at both the 2018 IIHF Women's World Championship Division I and 2019 IIHF Women's World Championship Division I, with Norway winning bronze in 2019. She was also selected as Best Goaltender by the directorate at the 2018 IIHF U18 Women's World Championship Division I Group A.

Awards and honors
Best Goaltender as selected by the directorate, 2019 IIHF Women's World Championship Division I Group A

References

External links 
 

2000 births
Living people
Norwegian women's ice hockey players
Ice hockey players at the 2016 Winter Youth Olympics
Mercyhurst Lakers women's ice hockey players
RPI Engineers women's ice hockey players
Norwegian expatriate ice hockey people
Norwegian expatriate sportspeople in Canada
Norwegian expatriate sportspeople in the United States
Expatriate ice hockey players in Canada
Expatriate ice hockey players in the United States